Denis Shapovalov is a Canadian professional tennis player who has been ranked as high as world No. 10 in singles and world No. 44 in doubles by the Association of Tennis Professionals (ATP). He has won one singles title on the ATP Tour in his career to date.

During his junior career, Shapovalov reached a peak ranking of No. 2 in the world in July 2016 after winning his first and only junior Grand Slam singles title at the 2016 Wimbledon Championships. He turned professional the following year and won two titles on the ATP Challenger Tour and one on the International Tennis Federation (ITF) Men's World Tennis Tour before he earned a wild card to the 2017 Canadian Open later that summer. There, the world No. 134 Shapovalov defeated top seed and world No. 2 Rafael Nadal in a third-round upset win, and he reached the semifinals before losing to eventual champion Alexander Zverev, a feat that earned him a top 100 debut in the ATP rankings. At the age of 18, he became the youngest player ever to reach the semifinals of an ATP Masters 1000 tournament. The next month, Shapovalov continued his success by qualifying for his second career Grand Slam main draw debut at the 2017 US Open and reaching the fourth round, which made him the youngest player to reach the fourth round of the US Open since Michael Chang in 1989. By the end of the year, he had soared 199 ranking spots to close his breakout 2017 as the world No. 51.

Shapovalov reached his first ATP Tour final at the 2019 Stockholm Open, during which he beat Filip Krajinović to clinch his first career ATP title. That same year, together with compatriots Félix Auger-Aliassime and Vasek Pospisil, he led Canada to its first-ever Davis Cup final, where they were runners-up to Spain. In 2020, he reached his career-high ranking of No. 10 following a Grand Slam quarterfinal debut at the 2020 US Open and a semifinal debut at the 2020 Italian Open, after which he finished the year with his highest year-end ranking of No. 12. He has reached a Grand Slam semifinal in singles once, at the 2021 Wimbledon Championships, and despite primarily playing singles, he has also made a Grand Slam quarterfinal in doubles with longtime doubles partner Rohan Bopanna at the 2020 US Open. In 2022 Davis Cup, Shapovalov teamed up with Félix Auger-Aliassime and Vasek Pospisil to give Canada its first-ever Davis Cup final win.

Keys

Performance timelines

Singles
Current through the 2023 Acapulco Open.

Doubles

Significant finals

Masters 1000 finals

Singles: 1 (1 runner up)

ATP career finals

Singles: 6 (1 title, 5 runner-ups)

Doubles: 2 (2 runner-ups)

ATP Challenger Tour

Singles: 3 (2 titles, 1 runner-up)

ITF Men's Circuit

Singles: 4 (4 titles)

Doubles: 3 (2 titles, 1 runner-up)

ITF Junior Circuit

Singles: 6 (5 titles, 1 runner-up)

Doubles: 3 (2 titles, 1 runner-up)

Career Grand Slam tournament statistics

Career Grand Slam tournament seedings

*

Best Grand Slam results details

Record against top 10 players

Active players active are listed in boldface. Only ATP Tour main draw matches are considered:

Wins over top 10 opponents
He has a  record against players who were, at the time the match was played, ranked in the top 10.

:*

National representation

ATP Cup

Titles: 1 (1 win, 0 runner-ups)

Participation: 16 (9 wins, 7 losses)

Davis Cup

Titles: 0 (0 wins, 1 runner-up)

Participation: 20 (12 wins, 8 losses)

Junior Davis Cup

Titles: 1 (1 win, 0 runner-ups)

Participation: 8 (8 wins, 0 losses)

Notes

References

General
Career finals, Grand Slam seedings, information for both the singles and doubles performance timelines, top 10 wins, and national participation information have been taken from these sources:

 
  
  
  
  
  
  
  
  
  
  

  
  
  
  
  
 

Specific

External links
 
 
 

Shapovalov, Denis